The Barnard–Garn–Barber House, at 1198 N. Main St. in Centerville, Utah, was built in phases in c.1854, c.1870, and c.1898  It was listed on the National Register of Historic Places in 1997.

It was built as a stone hall–parlor house by James Barnard, and a second stone part of the house was built by Micah and Fanny Garn.  The Thomas and Julia Barber family added a brick extension at the rear and added a Victorian style brick gable end that faces to the front.  The house has historic significance for representing stages of growth of Centerville, and, at the time of its NRHP nomination in 1997, was well-preserved.

References

Houses on the National Register of Historic Places in Utah
Georgian architecture in Utah
Victorian architecture in Utah
Houses completed in 1854
Houses in Davis County, Utah
National Register of Historic Places in Davis County, Utah